Ilkley is a town and civil parish in West Yorkshire, in the north of England. It has been inhabited since at least the Mesolithic period; was the site of a Roman fort, and much later an early example of a spa town. In more recent times it serves as a residential district within the travel to work areas of Bradford, Leeds and Keighley.

According to the probably outdated history of the 19th century clergyman Robert Collyer, Ilkley takes its name from "Llecan, the old British word for rock", this, presumably, alluding to the craggy prominences of the area such as the Cow and Calf on Ilkley Moor.

Prehistory
The earliest evidence of habitation in the Ilkley area is flint arrowheads or microliths, dating to the Mesolithic period, from about 11,000 BC onwards. A selection of arrowheads and information about prehistoric Ilkley can be seen in the Heritage Room at Ilkley Manor House. The area around Ilkley has been continuously settled since at least the early Bronze Age, around 1800 BC; more than 250 cup and ring marks, and curved a swastika carving dating to the period have been found on rock outcrops,<ref name=Beckensall>Beckensall, S., 2009, 'Prehistoric Rock Art in Britain, Chalford: Amberley Publishing, </ref> and archaeological remains of dwellings are found on Ilkley Moor. A druidical stone circle, the Twelve Apostles Stone Circle, was constructed 2,000 years ago. Serious interest in the rock art of Ilkley began after the publication in 1879, by John Romilly Allen, of "The Prehistoric Rock Sculptures of Ilkley" in The Journal of the British Archaeological Association.

Robert Collyer notes that Ilkley was at the centre of the territory of the Brigantes, and states that it was one of ten strongholds of this tribe. He notes  that the town was on a pre-Roman track-way running from the north through Catterick to Chester and Holyhead.

Roman period

In the Roman period, Ilkley lay at a crossroads of Roman roads, connecting to Catterick and Adel; Skipton and Gisburn; Aldborough, Knaresborough and Blubberhouses; and Morton leading to Manchester.

The remains of a Roman fort exist on a site now near the centre of the town. A number of authorities believe that the fort is that of Olicana, dating to 79 AD, but the identification is not settled. The fort's outline is clear: some one hundred and sixty yards by one hundred yards in size, it was placed on a steep bank above the River Wharfe on the north side, and bounded by deep channels of a brook immediately on the east and west. The southern boundary seems to have coincided with the present street. The foundations of the fort on the bank are very conspicuous, and remains of Roman brick, glass, and earthenware have been found on the edges of the brow. The Medieval Ilkley Manor House and All Saints Parish Church stand within the precincts of the fort.

A number of altars have been discovered dating to Roman times. The oldest was found in the south east corner of the church and now defaced. According to William Camden's account of a 1570 inspection, it is dated from the time of Emperor Antoninus Pius (138 to 161) and it named Caecilius as the Prefect of the Cohort. 

A second, retrieved from the Wharfe, is thought to have been dedicated by Clodius Front., the Roman Praefect, to Verbeia, the deification of the River Wharfe. It states that the cohort stationed in Olicana at that time was made up of soldiers from the Lingones tribe. In 1608, William Middleton of Myddelton Lodge commissioned a replica altar to be made as the original stone's inscription had started fading. As of February 2022, both the original Roman altar and the 1608 replica are safely housed and on display in the Heritage Room of Ilkley Manor House.

Another altar described by Camden dates to the time of Septimius Severus and his son Caracalla (211 to 217) and notes that the fort has been repaired under the superintendence of Virius Lupus, lieutenant and proprætor in Britain; from which we may conclude that the station was then in its fullest glory.

Anglo-Saxon period
Collyer notes that there is not one sure word about Ilkley in the 800 years after the improvement of the fort by Virius Lupus; but that by the Norman period the area had an Anglo-Saxon name, derived from the Roman and Old British names; was a parish with church and priest; and contained four centres of life and industry, namely Ilkley, Nessfield, Middleton and Stubham. He conjectures that Ilkley's place on the track and road system of the time would have ensured that it was affected by the waves of invasions of Britain which took place throughout the Dark Ages, with Angles, Saxons and Danes settling and bequeathing names to the locality, whilst at the same time perhaps squeezing out the indigenous and Roman descent population.
 
Ilkley's Anglo-Saxon church is taken by Collyer to date to a 627 consecration, and most probably arising out of preaching by Paulinus Three Anglo-Saxon crosses formerly in the churchyard of All Saints, but now removed into the church to prevent erosion, date to the 8th century.

Norman period and the Middleton family

Ilkley formed part of the Wapentake of Skyrack; its lands to the north of the river fell into the wapentake of Claro. In the Domesday Book, dating to 1086, Ilkley (Ilecliue/Illecliue/Illiclei/Illicleia) is listed as being in the possession of William de Percy 1st Baron Percy. By 1242 the land had passed to the Kyme family, of whose number Philip de Kyme appointed the first rector of the parish church on 11 December. The land was acquired by the Middelton family of Myddelton Lodge, from about a century after the time of William the Conqueror. The family lost possession through a series of land sales and mortgage repossessions throughout a period of about a hundred years from the early nineteenth century. The agents of William Middelton (1815–1885) were responsible for the design of the new town of Ilkley to replace the village which had stood there before.

Spa town and the railway

In the 17th and 18th centuries the town gained a reputation for the efficacy of its water. The Middleton family constructed and for many years maintained White Wells, an early example of a spa building containing dressing rooms and a bath fed from a spring, in the eighteenth century. The Middletons encouraged visitors by permitting shooting on the manor and fishing in the river. Prior to the spa boom, however, Ilkley was "a little, old and ragged village" of single storey thatched cottages.

In the 19th century the town became established as a fashionable spa town, with the construction a mile to the east of the town, at Wheatley, of the vast Ben Rhydding Hydro or Hydropathic Establishment between 1843 and 1844. Tourists flocked here to 'take the waters' and bathe in the cold water spring. Wheatley today is called Ben Rhydding after the Hydro (since demolished).

Development based on the Hydro movement, and upon the establishment of a number of convalescent homes and hospitals, was accelerated by the establishment of a railway connection from Leeds and Bradford in 1865. Charles Darwin underwent hydropathic treatment at Wells House when his book On the Origin of Species was published on 24 November 1859, staying with his family at the nearby North View House (now Hillside Court). Other Victorian visitors to the town include Madame Tussaud. Today, the only remaining Hydro is the white cottage known as White Wells House, which can be seen and visited on the edge of the moor over-looking the town.

20th century

During 1906–08 architect Edwin Lutyens built Heathcote, a particularly large Neoclassical style villa, for John Thomas Hemingway, a Bradford wool merchant. It is a Grade II* listed building.

T. S. Eliot in 1916 delivered six extension lectures in Ilkley, on the theme of modern French literature.
He considered Wensleydale to be the 'Mozart of cheeses'.

Between the 5 and 17 August 1923, philosopher and educator Rudolf Steiner delivered a series of fourteen lectures at Ilkley which were published as A Modern Art of Education.'' They provided a comprehensive overview of Waldorf education. In his report of the event, which embodies the language of his distinctive philosophical approach, he commented on the town's archaeological heritage:

in the remains of dolmens and old Druidic altars lying around everywhere, [Ilkley] has traces of something that reminds one of the ancient spirituality that has, however, no successors. It is most moving to have on the one hand the impression [of the industrialism] I just described and then, on the other, to climb a hill in this region so filled with the effects of those impressions and then find in those very characteristic places the remains of ancient sacrificial altars marked with appropriate signs.

In 1967 Jimi Hendrix played at the Troutbeck Hotel, now a nursing home, although the show was cut short by the police. The local newspaper headline read "Pop Fans Ran Amok in Hotel" after audience members allegedly ripped off doors, pulled out electrical fittings and smashed furniture after a police sergeant stepped on stage and stopped Hendrix midway through a number.

1973 saw the start of the annual Ilkley Literature Festival, the largest in Northern England. W. H. Auden gave his last English reading there that same year.

There was an alleged UFO incident on Ilkley Moor on 1 December 1987. A retired police officer claimed that he was abducted by aliens while on a morning walk and briefly held on their craft before being returned to the moor. The man took a photograph of the moor which he said shows one of the aliens that abducted him.

References and notes 

Ilkley
History of West Yorkshire
Ilkley
History of the City of Bradford